Ultraliga Season 6 was the 7th edition of the Ultraliga. AGO ROGUE was the defending champion. It was the last season Ultraliga covered only Poland and the last one with 8 teams. The competition was won by PDW as they won their 1st title.

Regular Season 
8 June 2021 – 21 July 2021

Playoffs 
27 July 2021 – 11 August 2021

Upper Bracket and Final

Lower Bracket 

PDW and Illuminar Gaming qualified for European Masters 2021 Summer Group Stage
AGO ROGUE qualified for European Masters 2021 Summer Play In Stage

References

Ultraliga seasons